Ngô Quang Huy (born 28 November 1990) is a Vietnamese footballer who plays as an attacking midfielder for V-League club Quảng Nam.

References 

1990 births
Living people
Vietnamese footballers
Association football midfielders
V.League 1 players
SHB Da Nang FC players